The Dover Strait coastal guns were long-range coastal artillery batteries that were sited on both sides of the English Channel during the Second World War. The British built several gun positions along the coast of Kent, England while the Germans fortified the Pas-de-Calais in occupied France. The Strait of Dover was strategically important because it is the narrowest part of the English channel. Batteries on both sides attacked shipping as well as bombarding the coastal towns and military installations. The German fortifications would be incorporated into the Atlantic Wall which was built between 1942 and 1944.

German installations
After the Fall of France in June 1940, Adolf Hitler personally discussed the possibility of invasion with Großadmiral (Grand Admiral) Erich Raeder, the Commander-in-Chief of the Kriegsmarine (German Navy) on 21 May 1940. Almost a month later on 25 June he ordered Oberkommando der Wehrmacht (OKW, supreme command of the armed forces) to begin preparation and feasibility studies, which had to be completed by 2 July, for the invasion of Britain. In an OKW directive on 10 July, operational coastal batteries under the control of the Kriegsmarine would support the invasion fleet.

On 16 July Hitler issued Fuhrer Directive 16 to have guns in place to support Operation Sea Lion:

Commencing on 22 July 1940, Organisation Todt began work on artillery positions primarily at Pas-de-Calais for every heavy artillery piece available; the batteries were required to be capable of withstanding the heaviest bombardments.

The first German guns began to be installed around the end of July 1940. The German batteries in order of construction were:
 Siegfried Battery at Audinghen, south of Cap Gris-Nez, with one 38 cm SK C/34 naval gun (15-inch) gun (later increased to 4 and renamed Todt Battery), shortly followed by:
 Three  guns at Friedrich August Battery, to the north of Boulogne-sur-Mer
 Four  guns at Grosser Kurfürst Battery at Cap Gris-Nez
 Two  guns at Prinz Heinrich Battery just outside Calais
 Two  guns at Oldenburg Battery in Calais
 Three 40.6 cm SK C/34 (16-inch) guns (from among the so-called Adolf Guns) at Lindemann Battery between Calais and Cap Blanc-Nez. The battery was named Lindemann after the fallen captain of the battleship Bismarck.

By early August, Siegfried Battery and Grosser Kurfürst Battery were fully operational as were all of the Army’s railway guns. The first shells landed in the Dover area during the second week of August 1940. The remainder, thirteen  guns and five  guns, plus additional motorised batteries comprising twelve  guns and ten  guns, could be fired at shipping but were of limited effectiveness due to their slow traverse speed, long loading time and ammunition types. Land-based guns have always been feared by navies because they are on a stationary platform and are thus more accurate (and can be larger, with more ammunition stowage) than those on board ships. Super-heavy railway guns can only be traversed by moving the entire gun and its carriage along a curved track, or by building a special cross track or turntable. This, combined with their slow rate of fire (measured in rounds per hour or even rounds per day), makes it difficult for them to hit moving targets. Another problem with super-heavy guns is that their barrels (which are difficult to make and expensive to replace) wear out relatively quickly, so they could not be fired often.

Better suited for use against naval targets were the four heavy naval batteries installed by mid-September: Friedrich August, Prinz Heinrich,  Oldenburg and Siegfried (later renamed Todt) – a total of eleven guns, with the firepower of a battlecruiser. Fire control for these guns was provided by both spotter aircraft and by DeTeGerät radar sets installed at Blanc-Nez and Cap d’Alprech. Two additional radar sites were added by mid-September: a DeTeGerät at Cap de la Hague and a FernDeTeGerät long-range radar at Cap d’Antifer near Le Havre.

The longest-ranged guns were  Kanone 12 in Eisenbahnlafette, manned by the Heer. Both guns, which were operated by Artillerie-Batterie 701 (E), remained on the Channel Coast until the Liberation of France in July 1944.

Most of the batteries continued firing until September 1944 when they were overrun during the clearing the Channel Coast. By then more than a thousand rounds had been fired by the German coastal batteries against England and shipping. The only two vessels to be sunk by German fire were:
 Sambut, 7,219 BRT, 6 June 1944
 Empire Lough, 2,824 BRT, 24 June 1944Empire Lough was one of 21 coastal vessels in the convoy ETC-17, escorted by the frigate  and corvette . On 24 June 1944, the convoy left Southend en route to the Seine Bay when the ships were engaged by German long-range coastal artillery guns off Dover. Empire Lough was set on fire and declared a total loss after she was beached near Folkestone. The master Robert Robinson and one crew member were lost. The freighter Gurden Gates (1,791 grt, built 1943) was damaged in the same action.

British emplacements

Having withdrawn in the Dunkirk evacuation and winning the Battle of Britain, the British did not have an immediate answer to the threat posed by the German coastal batteries. However, the high ground to either side of the Port of Dover was fortified on the personal order of Prime Minister Winston Churchill (who had visited the area to see the situation in person) and wanted large calibre guns dug in there. The only British cross-Channel guns already in place were two BL 14 inch Mk VII (35.6 cm) guns Winnie (named after Churchill) and – later in 1940 – Pooh (named after the story book character Winnie the Pooh) at St Margaret's at Cliffe. Both guns were spares taken from the stock of guns of the battleship . Their separate and well-camouflaged cordite and shell magazines were buried under deep layers of earth and connected to the guns by railway lines. Both batteries were camouflaged and protected from aerial attack by anti-aircraft emplacements behind and below St. Margaret's.

Both guns were operated from separate firing-control rooms and were manned by 25-man troop of the Royal Marines Siege Regiment. Although Winnie fired Britain's first shell onto continental Europe in August 1940 boosting morale, the Mk VII naval guns were slow to reload and ineffectual compared to the German guns in the Pas-de-Calais. Both conducted extreme range counter-battery operations against the German's coastal guns but they were too inaccurate and slow to fire on enemy shipping.

Due to these guns' lack of success in targeting shipping, Churchill ordered three new heavy gun batteries to be built in Dover and manned by the Royal Artillery:

The guns were later joined by Lydden Spout Battery, consisting of three more BL 6-inch Mk VII guns. Also, three BL 13.5-inch (343 mm) Mk V naval guns  from the First World War (named Gladiator, Scene Shifter and Piece Maker [sic]) were brought out of retirement in 1939 and mounted on railway chassis.

The British coast batteries sank:
 Pentiver, 2,382 BRT, 2 March 1943
 Livadia 3,094 BRT, 4 October 1943
 Munsterland 6,315 BRT, 20 January 1944
 Recum 5,500 BRT, 20 March 1944
 S.184 (sunk 5 September 1944, by its own troops)

Operational history
Hellfire Corner

This gunnery duel, along with heavy German shelling and bombing of Dover strait and the Dover area, led to this stretch of the Channel being nicknamed Hellfire Corner and led to 3,059 alerts, 216 civilian deaths and  damage to 10,056 premises in the Dover area. British coastal convoys had to pass through the bottleneck of the Dover strait to transport supplies, particularly coal; Britain's road and rail network was not then able to cope with the volume of traffic that had to be handled. Although the German guns regularly fired on these slow moving convoys from 1940 to 1944, with an interlude in 1943, they only sank two ships and damaged several others. Two seamen were killed and others were injured by shell splinters from near misses. However, the civilian crews of the merchant ships found the shelling more unnerving than the attacks by aircraft or E-boats that they were also subjected to and  there were instances of crews refusing to sail from their forming-up point at Southend-on-Sea because of the German guns.

The Channel Dash

Due to poor visibility and a number of communication failures by British forces, the first response to the German squadron was by the 9.2-inch guns of the South Foreland Battery, which were the only guns which could be directed by radar but the 10-cm S band set had only recently been installed and had never been used in conjunction with the guns. As the visibility was only , it was hoped that the radar would be able to register the splashes as the shells landed so that the guns would be able to correct their aim but nothing was detected. After firing three two-gun salvoes without being able to detect the "fall of shot" – the shells were actually landing almost a mile astern of the main German ships – it was decided to fire full salvoes using only the ranging information from the radar. None of the 33 shells fired came close to the German ships. A minute before the last shots were fired, South Foreland came under counter-battery fire from across the Channel but little damage was sustained.

Final duels

Accurate bombardment from the British heavy guns at Dover disabled the Grosser Kurfürst Battery at Floringzelle near Cap Gris Nez, ending the duels. Dover was finally freed from bombardment and to mark the event the town's mayor was sent a German flag from the batteries.

Legacy

Between Calais and Boulogne-sur-Mer considerable parts of the concrete gun emplacements and associated bunkers remain accessible, although often in somewhat dangerous conditions. One of the casemates of the Todt Battery can be visited at the Musée du Mur de l'Atlantique'', the Atlantic Wall Museum, at Audinghen. One of the Krupp K5 guns is also there. Since 1954, a section of painted armour plating taken as a war trophy from a turret of the Lindemann Battery has been on display on the Dover seafront. Many of the British batteries remained until the decision was taken to retire all the coastal artillery in 1956. The big 15-inch guns at Wanstone Farm were not removed until 1959. The sites have either been demolished, buried or left to decay. At Wanstone Farm Battery, ancillary buildings such as the plotting room and the guard house are visible, although overgrown and the sergeants' mess has reverted to its original use as a farm house.

See also
 V-3 cannon German supergun of 1943–44 at Mimoyecques, Pas-de-Calais
 Dover Castle
 Hougham Battery
 List of naval guns
 Operation Sea Lion
 Fan Bay Deep Shelter

Footnotes

References

Further reading

External links
 Batterie Todt in Northern France 
 DoverPages 
 BBC People's War
 Cross channel bombardments during Second World War
 British Pathé wartime newsreel of the 14-inch gun "Winnie" being loaded and fired
 British Pathé wartime newsreel of ships being shelled - the shells miss and  a spotter plane turns up but is forced to retreat by the RAF
 Terry Gander, Twentieth century British coast defence guns

Strait of Dover
Military history of the English Channel
World War II in the Pas-de-Calais
Military history of Kent
Large-calibre artillery
World War II sites in France
World War II sites in England
Dover District
Battles of World War II involving France
Battles of World War II involving Germany
Battles of World War II involving the United Kingdom
Kent coast